Michael D'Agostino (born 7 January 1987) is a Canadian former soccer player who is currently an assistant coach for the Vancouver Whitecaps of Major League Soccer.

He has played at Under-15 and Under-20 levels for Canada.

Background
D'Agostino was born in Langley, British Columbia and attended Langley Secondary School. After highschool, he was offered a full scholarship to the University of Kentucky. In 2005, he was the Wildcats' leading scorer with three goals and eleven assists. During his youth and university years he played every position on the pitch except goalkeeper.

Club career

Early career
In 2006 D'Agostino played in the Pacific Coast Soccer League for Whitecaps FC Reserves with whom he won the championship.

Blackpool
After having trials in Italy with Reggina and Messina, he had trials in England with Leeds United and then Blackpool where he played in a Reserves match. D'Agostino signed a one-year contract in September 2007 with Blackpool with an option for an additional year. On 4 October 2007, Blackpool received international clearance for him to play for the club.

Loan move to Cheltenham Town
After playing a few games for the Blackpool reserves team, Blackpool sent D'Agostino on loan to Football League One  club Cheltenham Town on 22 November until 1 January 2008. Blackpool manager, Simon Grayson said of the move, "This is a great opportunity for the lad to go and play some first team matches and we will be monitoring his progress closely."

D'Agostino went straight into the Cheltenham squad for their home match against Leeds United on 25 November. He was an unused substitute in the match, which Cheltenham won 1–0. Following three substitute appearances, D'Agostino made his full debut for the club on 29 December in a 1–0 away defeat to Tranmere Rovers. On 31 December his loan deal was extended by a further four weeks. On 2 January 2008 he made his home debut for the club in a 1–0 win against Port Vale. D'Agostino combined with Steven Gillespie to set up Paul Connor to score Cheltenham's goal. He received praise from the club's manager, Keith Downing, who said he had a "terrific home debut", D'Agostino won the "Man of the Match" award. The club's fans nicknamed him "Daggers" and his loan spell was due to end following the 1–0 home defeat to Millwall on 29 January. However, Cheltenham had already confirmed that they would try and extend the loan period further, and Blackpool manager Simon Grayson confirmed that the club were willing to extend the loan period by a further four weeks. His loan deal was extended by a further four weeks. Then on 31 January Blackpool agreed to extend the loan period until the end of the season, when he would return to Bloomfield Road and Blackpool expected to activate the one-year contract extension. Keith Downing said of the deal, "Hopefully they (Blackpool) are pleased with the progress Michael has made with us as we are helping him develop as a player as well." Simon Grayson added "Michael has done well. We will keep a regular check on his progress and next season I would imagine he will be in and around our squad."

Return to Blackpool
After returning to Blackpool, on 7 May 2008 Blackpool activated an option to extend his contract with the club by one year.

On 16 December 2008 he was released by Blackpool.

Hereford United
On 20 February 2009, after a short trial, D'Agostino joined League One club Hereford United on an initial one-month contract.
 D'Agostino never played a competitive match for Hereford, featuring as an unused substitute five times.

ICSF INTER
It was reported that Michael returned to Canada from England and signed with ICSF Inter of the VMSL for the 2010 season.

International career
In 2003 D'Agostino played for the Canadian Under 15 team in a tour of Germany. He was a member of the Canada U-20s that competed in the FIFA U-20 World Cup in 2007 which took place in Canada. Canada lost all three of its matches in the group stage, to Austria, Congo and Chile. D'Agostino played in just the one match against Austria. He has fourteen caps for the Canadian Under 20 team.

Honours
Whitecaps FC Reserves
Pacific Coast Soccer League champion (1): 2006

References

External links

Blackpool FC profile
Canada Soccer Profile
Interview with BBC Gloucestershire, 23 November 2007
Interview at soccercityfc.com

Living people
1987 births
Blackpool F.C. players
Hereford United F.C. players
Expatriate footballers in England
Canadian expatriate sportspeople in the United States
Canadian expatriate soccer players
Canadian soccer players
Canadian people of Italian descent
Cheltenham Town F.C. players
Kentucky Wildcats men's soccer players
Soccer players from Vancouver
University of Kentucky alumni
Sportfreunde Siegen players
English Football League players
Canada men's youth international soccer players
Association football midfielders
Canadian expatriate sportspeople in England
Vancouver Whitecaps FC non-playing staff